Jesper Asselman (born 12 March 1990) is a Dutch former professional racing cyclist, who rode professionally between 2009 and 2020, for the , , ,  and  teams. During the 2015 Eneco Tour, and after spending two consecutive days in the breakaway and winning bonus seconds, Asselman moved into the overall lead of the race.

Major results

2010
 7th Dwars door het Hageland
2011
 1st Stage 2b (TTT) Vuelta Ciclista a León
 2nd Ronde van Overijssel
 5th Ronde van Midden-Nederland
 9th Münsterland Giro
2012
 2nd Arno Wallaard Memorial
 7th Eschborn–Frankfurt Under–23
2013
 1st  Scratch, National Track Championships
 5th Ronde van Midden-Nederland
 7th Ronde van Limburg
2014
 3rd Overall Olympia's Tour
 6th Overall World Ports Classic
 6th Overall Okolo Slovenska
1st Stage 1 (TTT)
 6th Kernen Omloop Echt-Susteren
 7th Grote Prijs Stad Zottegem
 8th Grand Prix Südkärnten
2015
 4th Ronde van Drenthe
 4th Ronde van Limburg
2016
 1st Ronde van Drenthe
2017
 2nd Slag om Norg
 6th Le Samyn
 6th Dwars door West-Vlaanderen
2019
 1st Stage 1 Tour de Yorkshire
 9th Le Samyn
 9th Elfstedenronde
 10th Veenendaal–Veenendaal Classic
 10th Antwerp Port Epic

References

External links

 
 

1990 births
Living people
Dutch male cyclists
Sportspeople from Delft
Cyclists from South Holland
20th-century Dutch people
21st-century Dutch people